Brown snake may refer to:

 species of the genus Pseudonaja, highly venomous snakes native to Australia
 species of the genus Storeria, snakes endemic to North America and Central America
 King brown snake (Pseudechis australis), a highly venomous snake of the family Elapidae